Kassala (called Ash Sharqiyah during 1991—1994) is one of the 18 wilayat (states) of Sudan. It has an area of 36,710 km² and an estimated population of approximately 1,400,000 (2000). Kassala is the capital of the state; other towns in Kassala include Aroma, Hamashkoraib, Halfa el Jadida (New Halfa), Khashm el Girba and Telkuk.

In 2016, Kassala State suffered a severe bread shortage.

Localities
Kassala (Capital)
Aroma
Hamashkoraib
Halfa el Jadida
Khashm el Girba
Telkuk
Wad al Hulaywah

References

 
States of Sudan